Birt is a surname. Notable people with the surname include:

 Charlie Birt (born 1942), Canadian politician
 Fred Birt (1886–1956), Welsh rugby union player
 Jill Birt, keyboardist in Australian band The Triffids
 John Birt (footballer) (born 1937)
 John Birt (politician) (1873–1925), Australian politician
 John Birt, Baron Birt (born 1944), Director-General of the British Broadcasting Corporation 1992–2000
 Michael Birt (barrister) (born 1948), lawyer and Bailiff of Jersey in the Channel Islands
 Michael Birt (biochemist) (1932–2001), Australian academician
 Peter Birt (c. 1723–1791), English businessman
 Suzanne Birt (born 1981), Canadian curler
 Travis Birt (born 1981), Australian former cricketer
 William Radcliffe Birt (1804–1881), British astronomer